The Cartwheel Galaxy (also known as ESO 350-40 or PGC 2248) is a lenticular ring galaxy about 500 million light-years away in the constellation Sculptor.

It was discovered by Fritz Zwicky in 1941. Zwicky considered his discovery "one of the most complicated structures awaiting its explanation on the basis of stellar dynamics."

An estimation of the galaxy's span resulted in a conclusion of 150,000 light years, slightly smaller than the Andromeda Galaxy.

The large Cartwheel Galaxy is the dominant member of the Cartwheel Galaxy group, consisting of four physically associated spiral galaxies. The three companions are referred to in several studies as G1, the smaller irregular blue Magellanic spiral; G2, the yellow compact spiral with a tidal tail; and G3, a more distant spiral often seen in wide field images.

SN 2021afdx, a type II supernova in the Cartwheel Galaxy, was discovered in November 2021.

Structures
The structure of the Cartwheel Galaxy is noted to be extremely complicated and heavily disturbed. The Cartwheel consists of two rings: the outer ring, the site of massive ongoing star formation due to gas and dust compression; and the inner nucleic ring that surrounds the galactic center. A ring of dark absorbing dust is also present in the nucleic ring. Several optical arms or “spokes” are seen connecting the outer ring to the inner, and are theorized to be reforming spiral arms following the collision. Observations show the presence of both non-thermal radio and optical spokes, but the two do not overlap and have been shown to be unassociated with each other, and thus are different structures.

Evolution
The galaxy was once a normal spiral galaxy before it apparently underwent a head-on “bullseye” style collision with a smaller companion approximately 200-300 million years prior to how we see the system today. When the nearby galaxy passed through the Cartwheel Galaxy, the force of the collision caused a powerful gravitational shock wave to expand through the galaxy, like a rock being tossed into a sandbed. Moving at high speed, the shock wave swept up and compressed gas and dust, creating a starburst around the galaxy's center portion that went unscathed as it expanded outwards. This explains the bluish ring around the center, brighter portion. It can be noted that the galaxy is beginning to retake the form of a normal spiral galaxy, with arms spreading out from a central core. These arms are often referred to as the cartwheel's “spokes”.

Alternatively, a model based on the gravitational Jeans instability of both axisymmetric (radial) and nonaxisymmetric (spiral) small-amplitude gravity perturbations allows an association between growing clumps of matter and the gravitationally unstable axisymmetric and nonaxisymmetric waves which take on the appearance of a ring and spokes. Based on observational data, however, this theory of ring galaxy evolution does not appear to apply to this specific galaxy.

While most images of the Cartwheel display three galaxies close together, a fourth physically associated companion (also known as G3) is known to be associated with the group through an HI tail that connects G3 to the cartwheel. Due to the presence of the HI tail, it is widely believed that G3 is the “bullet” galaxy that plunged through the disk of the cartwheel, creating its current shape, not G1 or G2. This hypothesis makes sense given the size and predicted age of the current structure (~300 million years old as mentioned before). Considering how close G1 and G2 are to the Cartwheel still, it is much more widely believed that the roughly 88 kpc (~287,000 light years) distant G3 is the intruding galaxy.

Neutral hydrogen tail mapping is extremely useful in determining “culprit” galaxies in similar cases where the answer is relatively unclear. Hydrogen gas, being the lightest and most abundant gas in galaxies, is easily torn away from parent galaxies through gravitational forces. Evidence of this can be seen in the Jellyfish Galaxy and the Comet Galaxy, which are undergoing a type of gravitational effect called ram pressure stripping, and other galaxies with tidal tails and star forming stellar streams associated with collisions and mergers. Ram pressure stripping will almost always cause trailing-dominant tails of HI gas as a galaxy infalls into a galaxy cluster, while mergers and collisions like the cartwheel often create leading-dominant tails as the culprit galaxy’s gravity attracts and pulls on the victim galaxy’s gas in the direction of the culprit's motion.

The existing structure of the cartwheel is expected to disintegrate over the next few hundred million years as the remaining gas, dust and stars that haven’t escaped the galaxy begin to infall back towards the center. It is likely that the galaxy will regain a spiral shape after the infall process completes and spiral density waves have a chance to reform. This is only possible if companions G1, G2 and G3 remain distant and do not undergo an additional collision with the cartwheel.

X-ray sources

The unusual shape of the Cartwheel Galaxy may be due to a collision with a smaller galaxy such as one of those in the lower left of the image. The most recent star burst (star formation due to compression waves) has lit up the Cartwheel rim, which has a diameter larger than that of the Milky Way. Star formation via starburst galaxies, such as the Cartwheel Galaxy, results in the formation of large and extremely luminous stars. When massive stars explode as supernovas, they leave behind neutron stars and black holes. Some of these neutron stars and black holes have nearby companion stars, and become powerful sources of X-rays as they pull matter off their companions (also known as ultra and hyperluminous X-ray sources). The brightest X-ray sources are likely black holes with companion stars, and appear as the white dots that lie along the rim of the X-ray image. The Cartwheel contains an exceptionally large number of these black hole binary X-ray sources, because many massive stars formed in the ring.

References

External links
 
 Galaxy Evolution Simulation:The Cartwheel Galaxy
 Cartwheel Galaxy at Constellation Guide
 Webb Captures Stellar Gymnastics in The Cartwheel Galaxy nasa.gov

Lenticular galaxies
Peculiar galaxies
Ring galaxies
Sculptor (constellation)
02248
Astronomical objects discovered in 1941